Nadezhdovka is a rural locality in Gustomoysky Selsoviet Rural Settlement, Lgovsky District, Kursk Oblast, Russia. Population:

Geography 
The village is located in the Seym River basin, 38 km from the Russia–Ukraine border, 81 km south-west of Kursk, 17 km south-west of the district center – the town Lgov, 6.5 km from the selsoviet center – Gustomoy.

 Climate
Nadezhdovka has a warm-summer humid continental climate (Dfb in the Köppen climate classification).

Transport 
Nadezhdovka is located 5 km from the road of regional importance  (Kursk – Lgov – Rylsk – border with Ukraine) as part of the European route E38, 1 km from the road of intermunicipal significance  (Ivanovskoye – Kolontayevka), on the road  (38N-112 – Nadezhdovka), 6 km from the nearest railway halt Kolontayevka (railway line 322 km – Lgov I).

The rural locality is situated 88.5 km from Kursk Vostochny Airport, 148 km from Belgorod International Airport and 291 km from Voronezh Peter the Great Airport.

References

Notes

Sources

Rural localities in Lgovsky District